Tiko Crofoot (born 29 January 1979) is a Fijian sailor. He competed in the Laser event at the 1996 Summer Olympics.

References

External links
 

1979 births
Living people
Fijian male sailors (sport)
Olympic sailors of Fiji
Sailors at the 1996 Summer Olympics – Laser
Place of birth missing (living people)